Pampa Passage is a ship passage along the east side of Brabant Island, trending southwestward between the latter island and off-lying Lecointe Island and Pampa Island. The name "Bahia Pampa" was given by the Argentine Antarctic expedition of 1947-48 after the term passage is considered apt for this feature.

Maps
 Antarctic Digital Database (ADD). Scale 1:250000 topographic map of Antarctica. Scientific Committee on Antarctic Research (SCAR). Since 1993, regularly upgraded and updated.
British Antarctic Territory. Scale 1:200000 topographic map. DOS 610 Series, Sheet W 64 62. Directorate of Overseas Surveys, Tolworth, UK, 1980.
Brabant Island to Argentine Islands. Scale 1:250000 topographic map. British Antarctic Survey, 2008.

Straits of the Palmer Archipelago